Kantira is a village in Jajpur district of Odisha, India.

Demographics 
According to the 2011 Census of India, Kantira had a population of 1,448, of which 750 were males and 698 were females. Population within the age group of 0 to 6 years was 196. The total number of literates in Kantira was 880, which constituted 70.29% of the population with male literacy of 80.50% and female literacy of 59.57%. The Scheduled Castes and Scheduled Tribes population under India's system of positive discrimination was 1,311 and 0 respectively. Kantira had 283 households in 2011.

References 

Villages in Jajpur district